Georgy Kossov also known as Yegor Chekryakovsky (literally Yegor of Chekryak, Yegor being a simplified form of Georgy; 4 April 1855 – 19 April 1928) was a Russian Orthodox priest and a starets. On 9 October 2000 he was Glorified as a saint.

Kossov's biography was written in Sergei Nilus's book Father Yegor Checkryakovsky. He is often referred as the soul heir of Amvrosy of Optino.

Kossov was born to the family of a village priest in the village of Androsovo, Oryol Governorate, Russia. He graduated from Oryol seminary, taught in the village school of Oryol Governorate. In 1884 he became a priest of the village of Spas-Chekryak near the town Bolkhov of Oryol Governorate. He worked there until his death in 1928.

Kossov was famous for his prophecies including the prophecy of the October Revolution. He rebuilt the church of the Spas-Chekryak village, organized a boys' school and a girls' orphanage.

In 2000 he was formally glorified and his relics were transferred to the Cathedral of Bolkhov town.

References
The heir by staretsdom of Amvrosy of Optina by Yekaterina Kazakova, Bolkhovskaya Starina, 2 April 2005

Russian saints
1855 births
1928 deaths
20th-century Christian saints
People from Kursk Oblast